Villy may refer to the following places:

in France: 
Villy, Ardennes, in the Ardennes département
Villy, Yonne, in the Yonne département 
Villy Bocage, in the Calvados département
Villy-en-Auxois, in the Côte-d'Or département 
Villy-en-Trodes, in the Aube département
Villy-le-Bois, in the Aube département 
Villy-le-Bouveret, in the Haute-Savoie département 
Villy-le-Maréchal, in the Aube département 
Villy-le-Moutier, in the Côte-d'Or département
Villy-le-Pelloux, in the Haute-Savoie département 
Villy lez Falaise, in the Calvados département
Villy-sur-Yères, in the Seine-Maritime département   
Villy, Burkina Faso, a town in central Burkina Faso

See also
Billy (disambiguation)
Willy (disambiguation)